Mary Alden Hopkins (1876 – November 8, 1960) was an American journalist, essayist, and activist. She served as editor for several leading magazines and did freelance work for literary groups including The Atlantic Monthly, The American Mercury, and The New York Times magazine. Hopkins published polemical pieces in both mainstream and special-interest journals on labor reform, dress reform, birth control, pacifism, vegetarianism, and suffrage. Her creative writing was shaped by her politics as she wrote poems and novels about peace, women's suffrage, and other social issues.

Early life 
Hopkins was born in Bangor, Maine, in 1876. Her father George H. Hopkins was a banker and she grew up in a home that was described by Hopkins as “monogamous, Republican, and Protestant.” Her mother Mary Allen Webster Hopkins was considered to be extremely sensitive to responsibility and hated routine duties but her conscience forced her to perform them anyway and she may have been suffering from mental illness ("nervous prostration") long before it was recognized by medical professionals, so both the mother and daughter thought that taking care of Mary as a child was what made her mother sick. Hopkins assumed as a child that she was to blame for her mother's unhappiness. and early in her life she decided that the least she could do for her parents was to earn her own living to “lessen [her] sense of guilt in living at all.” Hopkins learned about eighteenth-century England as her father had an extensive library.

She was engaged to an unnamed man, but her parents disapproved of her potential husband, so he went to work in the city to get more wealth for her parents’ approval while Hopkins stayed behind to work in Bangor. However, Hopkins found out that her fiancé had married a woman whom he met in the city and had been living with. Later on, Hopkins studied at Wellesley College and at Columbia University where she earned her master's degree.

U.S. women's suffrage involvement 
After her studies, Hopkins entered New York activist circles as a journalist and essayist, publishing works in both mainstream and special-interest journals on labor reform, dress reform, birth control, pacifism, vegetarianism, and suffrage. Her creative writing, poems and fiction were shaped by her politics. Hopkins published creative works and journalistic pieces in advocacy journals such as The Woman’s Journal, The Suffragist, and The Woman Voter, radical periodicals such as The Masses, and middlebrow journals such as Harper’s, Collier’s, and Scribner’s, as well as mainstream newspapers and presses like the New York Tribune.

After the United States declared war on Germany in April 1917, the Woman's Peace Party (WPP) supported US intervention except for the New York branch of the party (NYC-WPP). The NYC-WPP's anti-war sentiments appeared in their bi-weekly periodical Four Lights with a gender-based critique of American society and democracy. On July 14, 1917, Hopkins, a member of the NYC-WPP along with other young educated radical reformers, wrote an editorial for Four Lights titled, “What are the War Aims and Peace terms of the American Women?” Hopkins mocked women's involvement in war work in two ways. She first argued against the assumption that women's presumed roles as mothers and wives would prevent them from participating in politics. Secondly, she argued that the work that women did in their lives such as raising their children would end up being pointless because war would lead to the oppression and death of their children in battle. After the United States Department of Justice (DOJ) claimed that two of their issues were traitorous, the post office refused delivery of the journal, the DOJ interrogated the women as the NYC-WPP's anti-war sentiments were seen as unpatriotic, and Four Lights ceased production in October 1917.

Written works

Journal and magazine articles 

Hopkins' articles include:

 December 1904 - “Children’s Column”, The Woman’s Journal, Vol. XXXV, Issue 53
 July 1910 - “Life’s Handicapped: An Able Bodied Job for the Crippled Man”, The Designer and the Women’s Magazine, Vol. XXXII, Issue 3
 December 1911 - “Boundaries of Home”, The Woman's Journal, Vol. XLII, Issue 50
 Original title before being renamed “Woman’s Place” in later publications
 May 1912 - “Women March” Collier’s The National Weekly
 November 1913 - “Woman’s Place”, The Woman’s Journal, Vol. XLIV, Issue 44
 May 1918 - “The Girls in the Wake of War” The Designer and the Woman’s Magazine, Vol. 48, Issue 1
 January 1919 - “Every Baby is Everybody’s Baby”, The Designer and the Woman’s Magazine Vol. 49, Issue 3
 May 1919 - “Women’s War Work is Never Done”, The Designer and the Woman’s Magazine, Vol. 50, Issue 1
 October 1919 - “The Household Assistant”, The Designer and the Woman’s Magazine, Vol. 50, Issue 6
 July 1921 - “The Woman Citizen”, The Woman’s Journal, Vol. VI, Issue 5
 August 1921 - “Rubber-Tired Camping”, The Designer and the Woman’s Magazine, Vol. 54, Issue 3
 December 1921 - “Barriers in Women’s Minds”, The Woman’s Journal
 April 1922 - “Say, Am I Engaged?” The Designer and The Woman’s Magazine, Vol. 55, Issue 5
 June 1922 - “The Soup-Dinner Stunt” The Designer and the Woman’s Magazine, Vol. 56, Issue 1
 February 1923 - “Why Women Nag”, The Designer and the Woman’s Magazine, Vol. 57, Issue 3
 March 1923 - “Good Women who are Dishonest”, The Designer and the Woman’s Magazine, Vol. 57, Issue 4
 April 1923 - “Fifty-Fifty Wives”, The Woman’s Journal, Vol. VII, Issue 23
 May 1923 - “Love Turns to Hate”, The Designer and the Woman’s Magazine, Vol. 57, Issue 6
 August 1923 - “How Many Lies Do You Believe?”, The Designer and the Woman’s Magazine, Vol. 58, Issue 3
 October 1923 - “Love That Devours”, The Designer and the Woman’s Magazine, Vol. 58, Issue 5

Books

With Doris Webster 

 
 
 
  `

Later life and death 
Some of the writers Hopkins enjoyed reading include Charles Fox Hovey, Richard Le Gallienne, Marie Corelli and Hall Caine, and she enjoyed art of the Pre-Raphaelites. Later in her forties, Hopkins lost faith in protest and rebellion as she noticed that the radicals fighting against these institutions “get no more satisfaction than did the conformists and smugness seemed equally common among both extremes.”

Along with the stopped publication of the Four Lights, the mixed results that activists got led to the question of “will it work” becoming her moral code. She insisted that it was “nobody’s fault” that ”men got the good jobs” and that “virtuous women shriveled at their desks.” Hopkins’ was uncertain whether life would improve for the younger generation of women coming after her since it took her a longer time for her to reach where she was in her career at that point in her forties compared to a man who got to same place in less time.

Near the end of her life, she lived in Newtown, Connecticut. Hopkins died on November 8, 1960, in Danbury, Connecticut. She is buried at Mount Hope Cemetery in Bangor, Maine.

Legacy 
On August 4, 2016, the Bangor Historical Society hosted a lecture event in the Isaac Farrar Mansion with a descendant of Mary Alden Hopkins, Bill Hopkins, where he spoke about his research into Mary Alden Hopkins’ past upbringing and the impact she left behind as a journalist, suffragette, author, and feminist.

References 

1876 births
1960 deaths
Wellesley College alumni
20th-century American women writers
20th-century American novelists
American women novelists
American women poets
20th-century American poets
Novelists from Maine
Poets from Maine
Columbia University alumni
Journalists from Maine
20th-century American journalists
American women journalists
American suffragists
American magazine editors
Women magazine editors
20th-century American essayists
American women essayists
Writers from Bangor, Maine
Burials at Mount Hope Cemetery (Bangor, Maine)